The Triangle Expressway (TriEx)  is the first modern toll road built in North Carolina, and one of the first toll roads in the United States built to use only electronic toll collection instead of toll booths. The overall freeway consists of two segments called the Triangle Parkway and the Western Wake Freeway. The six-lane Triangle Parkway extends Interstate 885 (I-885)  via North Carolina Highway 885 (NC 885) in Durham County to meet North Carolina Highway 540 (NC 540) in Morrisville in Wake County.

Description of the project
The money for the project comes from $625 million in bonds and a $387 million loan from the federal government. The North Carolina Turnpike Authority deposited this money on July 29, 2009, and on the same day the agency's executive director David W. Joyner signed contracts to pay $584 million of that money to three companies to build the road over the next 42 months, creating 13,800 jobs.

Triangle Parkway 
S. T. Wooten Corp. of Wilson, North Carolina built the  northern section, an extension of NC 147 called Triangle Parkway, at a cost of $137.5 million, including an electronic toll plaza on I-540. The new road opened for traffic on December 8, 2011 and extends from the previously existing section of NC 147 (Now I-885) south from I-40 to an  section of the Northern Wake Expressway. Completed in 2007, the existing section became part of the toll road August 2, 2012 (originally envisioned as part of I-540, because of rules against tolls on interstate highways, this section is now called NC 540. When Research Triangle Park (RTP) was created in the late 1950s, a corridor of land was preserved to be available for the Triangle Parkway's eventual construction.

Actual tolling of the new section of road began January 3, 2012.

Western Wake Freeway 
Granite Construction of Watsonville, California, and Archer Western Contractors of Atlanta worked together as Raleigh Durham Roadbuilders to complete the  Western Wake Freeway at a cost of $446.5 million. This section of the Triangle Expressway, which extends from NC 55 at RTP to NC 55 at Holly Springs, will become part of NC 540. In summer 2009, work began on the freeway. On August 1, 2012, the  second section from NC 55 to US 64 opened, with the remaining six miles south of US 64 to NC 55 in Holly Springs opening December 20, 2012. Tolls and $25 million a year from the North Carolina legislature will finance the project.

Tolls

The Triangle Expressway is built as an all-electronic toll road with billing by license plate, similar to Maryland's Route 200 (InterCounty Connector, largely opened to traffic in 2011).

Drivers can open an account and use a North Carolina Quick Pass transponder, which results in a lower rate. Other drivers will have their license plates photographed, and they will receive a bill.

On May 4, 2010, the Turnpike Authority signed a contract with TransCore to provide transponders. Drivers can, however, use their existing accounts; North Carolina becomes the only state to offer this option. 350,000 new transponders are expected to be issued in the first five years. Transponder sales began October 11, 2011. In later years, interoperability was established with the following ETC systems: E-ZPass, Peach Pass and SunPass.

At the time of its opening, residents in the area have complained about the tolls, considering that the new highway is the only toll road in North Carolina, and especially since other large sections of 540 have been completed without tolls.  Business people who plan to use the highway, however, claim that the time savings will more than balance out the cost.

Toll rates 
As of January 1, 2018, the total trip rate is $3.25 with the North Carolina Quick Pass and $5.00 via bill-by-mail. As of 2022, the total trip rate is $3.71 with the North Carolina Quick Pass and $5.68 via bill-by-mail. Listed below is the 2018 toll rate breakdown, by gantry:

History
The "Triangle Parkway" was first proposed in 1958, as part of Research Triangle Park. On February 16, 2005, it was one of four roads selected by the Turnpike Authority to be built as toll roads in North Carolina. An additional $29 million could be spent extending that highway  to McCrimmon Parkway in Morrisville, whose leaders opposed the idea. The original parkway route, however, had no real opponents.

At the groundbreaking ceremony in 2009, Representative David Price pointed out that using tolls to finance this road "was not our first choice." Instead, area governments concluded the road would have taken 15 more years to complete any other way, so the decision to charge tolls came in 2005. The  Western Wake Expressway from RTP to Holly Springs had been delayed earlier in the year, and the legislature had increased the number of toll projects allowed from four to nine.

In July 2006, the legislature decided to allow the section of I-540 connecting the Triangle Parkway and Western Wake Expressway to be a toll road if the other two roads were also toll roads, even though the road was already being built.

Federal approval for the use of tolls came in January 2007. The Turnpike Authority asked that the new section of road not be called an Interstate.

Just before the July 2007 opening of the  I-540 section between I-40 and NC 55, I-540 signs came down, replaced with NC 540 signs. Using the designation NC 540, a decision made in May 2007, was less confusing than giving the road an entirely new number.

The name "Triangle Expressway" became official in May 2007, and turnpike board member Perry R. Safran said the committee also wanted the nickname "TriEx".

On November 14, 2007, the board decided toll booths would not be used, and on June 5, 2008, the State House voted to approve $25 million a year for 39 years for the project. This would cover the difference between expected toll collections and actual costs.

Groundbreaking was held on August 12, 2009 at the west end of Interstate 540 (I-540). "A dozen dignitaries" used shovels painted gold as 150 watched.

On December 8, 2011, the first leg of the Triangle Expressway opened to traffic. Toll collection began January 3, 2012.

On August 1, 2012, the second section of the Triangle Expressway, from Research Triangle Park to U.S. 64, opened. Toll collection began the following day.

On December 20, 2012, the section from U.S. 64 to NC 55 in Holly Springs opened with toll collection beginning in January.

Toll rates change almost annually as required by the bond covenant created for the funding of the Expressway.  Since its initial rate set at 2012, it has increased in 2013, 2015 and 2016.

On January 20, 2017, the expressway was chosen as one of 10 testing locations for driverless cars.

On June 30, 2022, Toll NC 147 was re-designated as Toll NC 885 as a part of the opening of the East End Connector Project.

Future
Planned as the next phase of the Triangle Expressway and the final segment of the Raleigh Beltway, the Triangle Expressway Southeast Extension (also known as the Southern and Eastern Wake Freeways) will traverse  linking NC 540 and I-540, just south of Knightdale.  Planning for the route started in 2010, but was put on hold on March, 2011 by the enactment of North Carolina Session Law 2011-7 (N.C. S.L. 2011-7). This law stated routes to study "shall not be located north of" the Orange Route, shown on maps for 20 years, potentially impacting wetlands and endangered mollusks. The U.S. Army Corps of Engineers opposed the Orange Route unless other potential routes could be found. A map unveiled August 22, 2012 shows the Lilac Route and the Plum Route, which would result in less environmental impact but would cause the loss of more homes. Planners hoped for a final route by 2014.  On December 7, 2012, the Federal Highway Administration and the U.S. Army Corps of Engineers replied to NCDOT saying they could not legally evaluate the Orange Route without comparing it to another route expected to cause less environmental harm.  Since there was an impasse between the Federal government and the state regarding the issue, the federal funds for the project were cut, putting the Southeast Extension on hiatus.

A Draft Environmental Impact Statement released in late 2015 included 17 options, the Red Route included. Construction west of Interstate 40 would start in 2018 or later. The Lilac Route avoided the environmental problems of the Orange Route but like the Red Route would result in many homes being lost, and the Raleigh water treatment plant would also be affected. The Blue Route and Purple Route to the south of the others would cause the loss of even more homes. East of Interstate 40, there was no preferred route, and all of the options had problems.

In June 2018, the federal government approved a 28.4 mile (45.71 km) extension of NC-540 which would complete the southern loop of NC-540 around Raleigh from the current terminus in Holly Springs to the Interstate 540 terminus in Knightdale. The project will be completed in multiple phases and cost approximately $2.24 billion.

Exit list

Note – Exit numbers are based on NC 885 or NC 540.

See also

References

External links

North Carolina Turnpike Authority (NCTA)
North Carolina Turnpike Authority (NCTA) website for the Triangle Expressway project
NCQuickPass Triangle Expressway Toll Guide

Toll roads in North Carolina
Research Triangle
Freeways in North Carolina
Transportation in Wake County, North Carolina
Transportation in Durham County, North Carolina